Rick Ware Racing (RWR) is an American motorsports team which currently competes in the NASCAR Cup Series,  WeatherTech SportsCar Championship, and NTT IndyCar Series.

History
The organizational roots of RWR date back to Ware & Sons Racing with Rick and his father John Ware competing in the SCCA Series. They raced under the banner "Ware & Sons" as early as the 1960s when Rick went go-kart racing. Once of legal driving age, Rick joined his father John Ware in the SCCA and IMSA Series.

In 1983, Ware & Sons won Rookie of the Year in the California Sports Car Club with Rick behind the wheel. Ware & Sons with Rick as the driver went on to win several titles in that series, as well as the SCCA and IMSA Championship.

After a stint as a driver in the NASCAR Winston Cup Series, Ware renamed the organization Ware Racing Enterprises in the 1990s and eventually Rick Ware Racing in 2004.

The team's shop was previously located in Thomasville, North Carolina. In 2020, they moved to Mooresville, North Carolina during the two months (March to May) that the series could not race due to the beginning of the COVID-19 pandemic. The move coincided with RWR buying Premium Motorsports which added their No. 15 car as a fourth full-time car in their stable and needing more space. Before the 2023 season, RWR moved from Mooresville to a shop in Concord, North Carolina on the campus of RFK Racing, which the team began an alliance with in 2023.

NASCAR

NASCAR Cup Series

Early years (1998–2012)
In 1998, Rick Ware attempted to qualify a Ware Racing Enterprises Ford in the Winston Cup event at Sears Point Raceway but failed to make the race.

Rick Ware Racing (RWR) had made a handful of attempts in the NASCAR Cup Series beginning in 2004 with Stanton Barrett in the No. 52. In 2005, the organization made attempts with Larry Gunselman, José Luis Ramírez and Derrike Cope. In 2006 Larry Gunselman, Steve Portenga, Donnie Neuenberger and Stanton Barrett in the No. 52 and No. 30 respectively.

In 2007, Barrett attempted to make the Daytona 500 only to miss the race by a single position.

In 2011, Rick Ware Racing allied with the No. 37 Front Row Motorsports/Max Q Motorsports Sprint Cup Team. American Le Mans Series driver Tomy Drissi qualified for the Infineon Cup race, but NASCAR would not approve him for competition; Chris Cook drove the 37 to a 27th-place finish.

For 2012, Rick Ware Racing again allied with Max Q Motorsports to run Timmy Hill for the majority of the season in the No. 37 to vie for Rookie of the Year honors. After Mike Wallace failed to make Daytona, Hill DNQ'd the next race, but qualified in Vegas; he finished 42nd after a crash. When the team missed five races in six attempts, they were outside the top 35 and Ware moved Hill back to Nationwide, ending the partnership.

Full-time (2017–present)
In 2017, Rick Ware Racing came back to the Cup Series with the No. 51 Chevrolet for most of the schedule.

In 2018, Rick Ware Racing ran with all three manufacturers and the team also secured a charter for the No. 51 car.  Later in the season, the team fields part-time No. 52 car.

For the 2019 season, Rick Ware Racing dropped Toyota to focus on running Chevrolets and Fords. The No. 51 team was registered as Petty Ware Racing after RWR leased the charter from Richard Petty Motorsports. In addition, RWR secured a full-time schedule for the No. 52 team after purchasing a charter from Front Row Motorsports, who had leased it to the now-defunct TriStar Motorsports. Starting with the 2019 Coca-Cola 600, RWR fielded a third team, the No. 53, on a part-time basis.  Starting with the 2019 Bass Pro Shops NRA Night Race, RWR fielded a fourth team, the No. 54, on a part-time basis.  On November 27, 2019, NASCAR imposed penalties to Rick Ware Racing, Premium Motorsports, and Spire Motorsports for manipulating their finishing order at Homestead. Each team was docked 50 owners' points and fined 50,000. In addition, competition directors Kenneth Evans of Rick Ware Racing and Scott Eggleston of Premium Motorsports were suspended indefinitely and fined 25,000 each.

For the 2020 season, RWR took a lease of the former charter of Front Row Motorsports' No. 36 team, allowing the No. 53 to run a full-time schedule. On May 13, 2020, Fox Sports' Bob Pockrass confirmed that Rick Ware Racing had purchased Premium Motorsports and their charter for the No. 15 car from former owner Jay Robinson. Rick Ware Racing continued to run the No. 15 full-time for Brennan Poole under the Premium Motorsports name in 2020.

On October 10, 2021, it was reported that RWR was going into an alliance with Stewart-Haas Racing and Roush Yates Engines beginning in 2022 as they will focus on running Fords.

Car No. 15 history 

On May 13, 2020, Premium Motorsports was acquired by the organization, along with it, the team's charter for the No. 15, which was piloted by Brennan Poole.  However, the 15 still ran under the Premium Motorsports banner. Poole ran all but one race (the Bristol Night Race, where Poole was replaced by J. J. Yeley) for the rest of the season. Following 2020, Poole left the team.

In 2021, the team would officially be run under the RWR banner. The team announced that 1990 Daytona 500 winner, Derrike Cope, would make his final career start at Daytona 500 in the car. The car was also fielded in a collaboration with Cope's team, StarCom Racing. However, after qualifying, Cope was penalized for electrical issues and failing numerous inspections and his qualifying time was disallowed. Also during the duels, Cope had issues with the car, placing 17th in his duel race, only completing 59 laps out the 63. Cope started 32nd in the race and only ran three laps before crashing on lap four, ending his day. After the 500, the team used multiple drivers for the 15 team through the rest of the season. James Davison made the most starts for the team with 16 starts, and gave the team's best finish with a 22nd-place finish in the Blue-Emu Maximum Pain Relief 500 at Martinsville. Dirt racer Chris Windom made his NASCAR Cup Series debut with the team at Bristol Dirt Race, driving the car. However, an engine failure caused Windom to drop out of the race and place the car 33rd. Later in April, Jennifer Jo Cobb was to make her NASCAR Cup debut at the GEICO 500 at Talladega; however, NASCAR announced on April 19 that she would not be approved to run the race. This was likely due to how the race itself would have been her first time in a Cup car because of the lack of practice and qualifying. Joey Gase would drive the car at Las Vegas, Kansas, Nashville, and Daytona. At the fall Las Vegas race, Gase was involved in a scary crash when the car lost a tire and slammed the wall, sending the car airborne. Gase was transported to the hospital and released a few hours later. At the Go Bowling at The Glen, R. C. Enerson would make his NASCAR Cup debut for the team at the race. Enerson would drive the 15 to a 34th-place finish. Bayley Currey drove at Atlanta in July. Ryan Ellis drove at Kansas in October, Ellis received the ride to make amends with the Ware family following a late wreck with Cody Ware during the Xfinity Race at Mid-Ohio.  Josh Bilicki would drive the 15 at the Roval event while Joey Hand drove Bilicki’s usual No. 52. Garrett Smithley would then finish out the year in the car. The team placed 35th in the owners points.

The No. 15 started the 2022 season with David Ragan scoring an eighth-place finish at the 2022 Daytona 500, the team's highest finish since its acquisition from Premium Motorsports. The car was shared with Smithley, Hand, Yeley, Ryan Preece, and Parker Kligerman. At Michigan, Yeley triggered a massive pileup on lap 25 that took Austin Cindric and Kyle Busch out of contention.

Car No. 15 results

Car No. 51 history

In 2017, Rick Ware Racing came back to the Cup Series with the No. 51 Chevrolet with plans to run the full schedule despite not having a charter. However things did not go according to the plan: Timmy Hill attempted the Daytona 500, but missed the field, the team then had Cody Ware make his debut at the next race in the Folds of Honor QuikTrip 500 at Atlanta, driving the No. 51 with sponsorship from Spoonful of Music and Bubba Burger. Ware qualified for the race as he started and finished 39th, retiring from the race on lap 74 with steering problems.  Hill drove the car in the next seven races until RWR withdrew the 51 at Talladega. the 51 and Hill returned for the next two races at Kansas Speedway, and the Coke 600. Cody Ware returned and did both the Dover and Pocono, Ware's No. 51 acquired sponsorship from East Carolina University and Clemson University, respectively, with the latter also featuring logos celebrating the football team's 2017 College Football Playoff National Championship win earlier in the year. During the Dover race, Ware withdrew from the event after 283 of 406 laps after suffering from back pain. A week later at Pocono, he left the race after completing 35 laps, again for back problems. Ware was going to race at Michigan but he decided to stay out of the car for the race and the team did not find a replacement driver in time, forcing them to miss their third race of the year. 
Josh Bilicki joined the team for the race at Sonoma and New Hampshire, while Kyle Weatherman, B. J. McLeod and Ray Black Jr. joined the team for races in the mid-to-late portions of the season. By the end of the year, the team only participated in 29 of the 36 races that season.

On November 22, 2017, it was announced that Black would return to the 51 for a full 2018 season with a charter. The team did not disclose how they had acquired the charter. However, the deal with Black soon fell apart, leaving the 51 open for another driver. Justin Marks drove the No. 51 at the Daytona 500, finishing 12th. The car was fielded in partnership with Premium Motorsports, powered by ECR Engines, and was sponsored by Harry's. Harrison Rhodes joined the team for a one-off the following week at Atlanta to make his Cup debut. A partnership with Stewart-Haas Racing brought Cole Custer to the car the following week at the spring Las Vegas race for his Cup debut. Timmy Hill was brought in for the next two races, finishing 33rd at both the spring Phoenix race and Fontana. Rhodes returned to the car for the next four races. Timmy Hill drove the car at the spring Talladega race. Cody Ware made his first start of the season at the spring Dover race. McLeod drove the car at the spring Kansas race and the 2018 Coca-Cola 600. Custer returned to the No. 51 at the Pocono 400 Chris Cook drove the No. 51 at Sonoma. Jeb Burton drove the No. 51 at the fall Martinsville race.

For the 2019 season, The No. 51 team was registered as Petty Ware Racing after RWR leased the charter from Richard Petty Motorsports. At the 2019 Daytona 500, both RWR cars triggered an unusual crash on lap 159. As several cars were entering pit road, Cody Ware and McLeod collided, sending McLeod to the infield grass and Ware slamming into Tyler Reddick, who inflicted serious damage on Jimmie Johnson's left rear quarter panel. Ware then hit Ricky Stenhouse Jr. from behind before resting on the infield grass, causing Stenhouse to collide with Reddick. McLeod, who drove the 51, finished the race 19th.  Andy Seuss joined the team for his Cup debut at New Hampshire Motor Speedway in July.

For the 2020 season, Joey Gase became the primary driver while Garrett Smithley drove the car at three races, James Davison doing four races, and Bilicki returned for the Charlotte Roval. The team finished the season 38th in the points standings.

For the 2021 season, Cody Ware returned as the primary driver for the No. 51 Nurtec ODT Chevrolet. Smithley returned for two races while J. J. Yeley ran two races and Davison returned for Watkins Glen. The No. 51 finished the season 34th in points. On December 1, RWR lost its lease to the No. 51's charter after GMS Racing purchased a majority stake in Richard Petty Motorsports. The charter was transferred to Petty GMS Motorsports' No. 42 car.

Cody Ware returned to the No. 51 for the 2022 season, using the former No. 52's charter. He scored a career-best 17th place finish at the 2022 Daytona 500. At Sonoma, the No. 51 failed pre-race inspection four times and was hit with an L1 penalty, resulting in a start at the back of the field and a pass-through penalty on the first lap. In addition, the team was deducted 20 owner and driver points. On August 23, crew chief Billy Plourde was suspended for four races after the No. 51 lost a ballast during the Watkins Glen race. At Texas, Ware survived a hard crash, colliding with the turn 4 wall before violently hitting the pit wall. He sustained an impaction fracture on his ankle from the crash. Ware missed the Charlotte Roval race due to his injury, with J. J. Yeley substituting him in the No. 51.

Car No. 51 results

Car No. 52, 27 history 

In 2018, RWR fielded the No. 52 on a partial schedule. The No. 52 car was set to make its debut at the Coca-Cola 600 with B. J. McLeod behind the wheel as Cody Ware was to drive the 51; however, the entry was withdrawn and McLeod was moved to the No. 51 car. The No. 52 instead made its debut with Cody Ware at Sonoma. J. J. Yeley, Gray Gaulding and Harrison Rhodes also drove the 52. At season’s end, the No. 52 did a total of six starts in the season with five different drivers, with its best finish being 30th at Indianapolis.

In 2019, RWR secured a full-time schedule for the No. 52 team after purchasing a charter from Front Row Motorsports, who had leased it to the now-defunct TriStar Motorsports. At the 2019 Daytona 500, both RWR cars triggered an unusual crash on lap 159. As several cars were entering pit road, Cody Ware and McLeod collided, sending McLeod to the infield grass and Ware slamming into Tyler Reddick, who inflicted serious damage on Jimmie Johnson's left rear quarter panel. Ware then hit Ricky Stenhouse Jr. from behind before resting on the infield grass, causing Stenhouse to collide with Reddick. Ware, who drove the 52, finished 39th. Prior to the Atlanta race, car chief Mike Chance was ejected from the track after the No. 52 failed pre-qualifying inspection multiple times. During the race, McLeod was involved in his second consecutive pit road incident when he pulled towards his pit stall and Ryan Preece slammed into the back of his car. McLeod's car then slammed into Chris Buescher's pit box and hit fueler Anthony Pasut, who suffered a broken fibula, a torn ACL, and other injuries to his right leg. The collision put Preece's car out of commission with a 35th-place finish while McLeod and Ware finished 32nd and 33rd, respectively. In March, Bayley Currey made his Cup debut in the No. 52 at Phoenix. On August 15, 2019, Currey was indefinitely suspended for violating NASCAR's Substance Abuse Policy. On September 18, Currey was reinstated by NASCAR after he successfully completed his Road to Recovery Program. Prior to the Talladega race, the No. 52's hauler caught fire at the garage due to an electrical short. The No. 52 finished 38th in the points standings.

In 2020, the No. 52 ran the first four races of the season with McLeod doing the 500 and Yeley running the following three races. However, after the organization purchased Premium Motorsports, the No. 52 switched the number to Premium’s No. 27, owing to sponsorship considerations. Yeley did the most starts in the 27 in 2020 with 24 starts; his best finish was 21st at Indianapolis. Gaulding did nine starts with his best finish being 25th at Texas) while Josh Bilicki and Cody Ware did the remaining two starts. Bilicki drove the 27 at Atlanta where he finished 34th. Cody Ware participated at the Talladega fall race. Towards the end of the race, due to a lot of front runners being involved in crashes, Ware was racing in the top ten until he crashed on the backstretch on the final lap, but was able to finish 19th for his first Cup Series top 20. The No. 52 finished 33rd in the points standings.

In 2021, the 27 would revert back into the 52 with Bilicki as the full-time driver. At the Daytona night race, Bilicki scored both his and the 52's first top ten by finishing 10th in the race. That same year, Joey Hand made his debut at the Charlotte Roval. Just like the previous season, the No. 52 finished 33rd in the points standings. At the end the 2021 season, the charter for the No. 52 was moved to the No. 51 car and the team was shut down.

Car No. 52 results

Car No. 53, 36, 28 history 

In 2019, RWR fielded a third team, the No. 53, on a part-time basis. The No. 53 made its debut at the 2019 Coca-Cola 600 with B. J. McLeod. Other drivers such as Josh Bilicki, Joey Gase, Spencer Boyd, and J. J. Yeley also drove the car. The No. 53 finished the season 39th in the points standings.

In 2020, RWR took lease of the former charter of Front Row Motorsports' No. 36 team, allowing the No. 53 to run a full-time schedule. The No. 53 car was renumbered to the No. 36 for the 2020 Daytona 500 with David Ragan as the driver. Front Row Motorsports prepared the car. The No. 53 finished the season 36th in points.

In 2021, The 53 car was returned to full-time competition with Garrett Smithley as the primary driver. However, during the spring Talladega weekend, The No. 53 was switched to No. 28 and ran as a tribute to Davey Allison with Gase as the driver. Just like the previous season, the No. 53 finished the season 36th in the points standings. At the end of the season, the No. 53 team was shut down and its charter was sold to Spire Motorsports for the No. 7 driven by Corey LaJoie.

Car No. 53 results 

-The No. 53 car was renumbered to the No. 36 for the 2020 Daytona 500 with David Ragan as the driver. Front Row Motorsports prepared the car.

-The 53 was renumbered to 28 in honor of Davey Allison for the GEICO 500 at Talladega Superspeedway.

Car No. 54 history 

In August 2019, RWR announced they were going to field a fourth car, the No. 54. The team planned to compete at the Bristol night race, with J. J. Yeley behind the wheel. The team originally received sponsorship from the thrash metal band Slayer to promote the band's final tour. However, some controversial incidents around metal bands caused Slayer to pull their sponsorship. RWR replaced the sponsor with PODS for the race. Yeley drove the car to a 28th-place finish. Garrett Smithley then raced a Lennie Pond throwback-paint-job at Darlington and finished 35th. Yeley returned to the team at Indianapolis and finished 26th, the No. 54's best finish. Smithley returned at Dover and finished 33rd.

In 2020, Yeley attempted the Daytona 500 in the car, but missed the field. RWR shut down the No. 54 team during the season.

Car No. 54 results

Xfinity Series
Rick Ware Racing made their NASCAR Nationwide Series debut in 2004 running a combination of Dodge and Chevrolet cars with various drivers. Stanton Barrett, Stan Boyd, Kim Crosby, Bobby Dotter, David Eshleman, Kenny Hendrick, Travis Powell, Morgan Shepherd, Shane Sieg, Dana White and J. J. Yeley all took turns at the wheel for RWR in their inaugural debut in the series under the No. 51 and No. 57 banner.

The organization took a five-year hiatus from the series to focus on the Motocross, Supercross, Arenacross, and Women's Motocross series' only to make a return in 2009.

With a new attitude, the organization returned under the Chevrolet banner and numbers 31 and 41.  RWR purchased equipment from Stanton Barrett Motorsports to start the season and quickly moved to ECR engines after power issues hindered the team.

Drivers Stanton Barrett, Derrike Cope, Tim Andrews, Travis Kittleson, Kerry Earnhardt, Tom Hubert, Kevin Hamlin, Daryl Harr and Justin Hobgood all split the time between the two cars. RWR later signed developmental driver Jeffrey Earnhardt, the grandson of Dale Earnhardt.  Jeffrey Earnhardt's series debut at Dover was cut short with a late crash in practice and a subsequent DNQ.

2009 was a significant year for RW. At Lowes Motor Speedway, Stanton Barrett qualified the No. 31 in the 11th position. Kerry Earnhardt finished 12th at Talladega Speedway and also qualified 8th at Daytona International Speedway, both organizational benchmarks. Tim Andrews went into the history books as he was led by crew chief and father Paul Andrews, marking the first time in NASCAR history that a father was a crew chief for a son in the Nationwide Series.

In 2010, RWR ran in select races as it focused on the NASCAR Camping World Truck Series. At Daytona, RWR went into the record books again, this time with driver Chrissy Wallace.  Wallace became the first female driver to make her series debut at Daytona in the No. 41 Chevrolet. Danica Patrick also accomplished the feat in the same event.  Stanton Barrett competed in the No. 31 Fuel Doctor Chevy at Daytona.

Barrett rallied to a 14th-place finish at Darlington Raceway while leading laps for the first time in RWR history. Barrett competed in 5 races for RWR in 2010 in both the 31 and 41 Chevrolet. J.C. Stout also made a race for Ware Racing at ORP.

For 2011, RWR returned to the Nationwide Series, running the No. 15 car with Ford's purchased from Roush Fenway Racing. Ware ran ARCA development driver Timmy Hill for Rookie of the Year honors. Hill won Rookie of the Year but was forced to miss the season opener at Daytona because Hill didn't turn 18 (NASCAR's minimum age to drive in the three national series) until February 25. Germain Racing ran the No. 15 Toyota in Hill's place with Todd Bodine at Daytona before selling the points to RWR. RWR also ran the No. 41 Ford with drivers Patrick Sheltra, Carl Long, Jennifer Jo Cobb and Doug Harrington. RWR also formed a partnership with Fleur-de-lis Motorsports, fielding the No. 68 for Tim Andrews, Carl Long and Matt Carter. Clay Greenfield made his NASCAR Nationwide Series debut for the team in their No. 71 car in Atlanta Motor Speedway but was pinched up into the wall just under 100 laps into the race and finished 35th after starting in the 43rd position. Hill would eventually win Rookie of the Year over primary rivals Blake Koch and Ryan Truex.

In 2012, Koch joined RWR full-time as Hill moved up to RWR's Sprint Cup program. Hill ran the season-opening race at Daytona before the No. 15 was moved to a limited schedule with Jeffrey Earnhardt driving at Bristol with Sam's Club. Koch's original sponsor dropped their agreement due to ESPN not showing the sponsor's ad due to Koch being an outspoken Christian. Hill returned to Nationwide after a failed Rookie of the Year run in Cup, and drove the 41 while Koch drove the 15 as an occasional start and park. Riggs started and parked for Ware in the 75.

In 2013, the team returned with the No. 15 Ford Mustang driven by Juan Carlos Blum and Harrison Rhodes. The team also fielded cars for Carl Long. For 2014, RWR drove primarily with Carlos Contreras, Hill, and Josh Reaume.

In 2015, the team reunited with Contreras and Hill, but also ran with B. J. McLeod and Jimmy Weller III. For 2016, the team celebrated its 25th anniversary, The team partnered with B. J. McLeod Motorsports to share the No. 15, while RWR runs the 25. The team shut down the Xfinity program after the 2016 season to focus on the Truck Series.

In 2017, despite this announcement, the team returned at Road America in a partnership with Mike Harmon Racing. John Graham drove the No. 74 (usually Harmon's number) for RWR because the car was locked in the race and Harmon's driver: Nicolas Hammann drove the No. 17 (usually RWR's number) and would have to qualify on time but since other cars withdrew both cars make the race. Cody Ware also drove for Harmon in a collaborative effort between RWR and MHR and he continues to drive the No. 74 car part-time for 2018.

In 2019, the team announced a full-time car numbered 17. Chris Cockrum drove at Daytona and Talladega. Bayley Currey ran most of the races. Kyle Weatherman ran at Bristol and other races. Starting sometime around the Charlotte race in May, RWR partnered with Mike Harmon Racing (again) to field the No. 17 car together for the remainder of the season. The font that Harmon uses on his No. 74 car is now used on the No. 17 as well. Camden Murphy drove at Charlotte and Pocono. The team withdrew at Iowa and was not entered at Daytona. The team sold their owner points before Iowa to the new No. 28 H2 Motorsports car driven by Shane Lee, which indicated that the team may only run part-time for the rest of the year. Josh Bilicki drove at Chicagoland after Currey qualified the car while Bilicki failed to qualify his own No. 38 car for RSS Racing. Both Murphy and Currey would return for Kentucky and New Hampshire, respectfully. Part-time ARCA Menards Series driver Mark Meunier attempted to make his Xfinity debut at Iowa in July but failed to qualify. The No. 17 would also skip both road course races at Watkins Glen and Mid-Ohio.

In May 2020, Ware formed a partnership with SS-Green Light Racing to field his drivers in the latter's No. 07 car; Ware is close friends with SS-Green Light owner Bobby Dotter. The collaboration spawned after the No. 07's regular driver Ray Black Jr. was forced to exit full-time racing to focus on his family business. Garrett Smithley took over the car for the partnership's first race at Charlotte.

In 2021, Ware's partnership with Dotter continued by Ware using Dotter's No. 08 owner points to field the No. 17 car. At the Alsco Uniforms 302, RWR fielded the No. 52 Toyota for Carson Ware using Jimmy Means Racing's owner points.

Car No. 17, 28 results

Car No. 52 results

Camping World Truck Series
Rick Ware Racing made its NASCAR debut in the Craftsman Truck Series.  In 1999, RWR made two starts, one with Randy MacDonald and the other with driver-owner Rick Ware in trucks 51 and 81.

In 2000, the organization was set to run the entire season with two teams, the 51 and 81 when Rick Ware was injured in a head-on crash at California Speedway that resulted in a career-ending fractured vertebra to the neck.  Ware moved into the ownership role to continue the team. Drivers Tom Boston, David Starr, Michael Dokken and Donnie Neuenberger finished out the 20 race schedule. Dokken produced an 8th-place finish at Loudon and led at Nazareth. Rick Ware finished a career-high of 13th at Texas.

For 2001, Brian Rose ran 15 races before heading off to Bobby Hamilton Racing. Nathan Buttke, Travis Clark, Dokken, Coy Gibbs, Donnie Neuenberger, Trent Owens, Jonathon Price, Sammy Ragan, Michael Ritch, Jerry Robertson, Brian Sockwell, Jason Thom and Rich Woodland Jr. completed the roster that watched Rick Ware Racing expand to a three and an occasional four race team with numbers 51, 71, 81, 91.

Dokken had a season-high of 11th at Nazareth, Rose finished 12th at Fontana and many others finished in the Top 20 with laps being led by Dokken and Ritch for the season.

In 2002, Rick Ware Racing switched to Dodge and fielded the 5, 51 and 81 entries for several drivers. Lance Hooper ran the most races for the team with a total of twelve events. Randy Briggs, Mike Cofer, Michael Dokken, Jason Hedlesky, Ryan Hemphill, Scott Kirkpatrick, Scott Kuhn, Carl Long, Blake Mallory, Donny Morelock, Donnie Neuenberger, Jonathon Price, Michael Ritch, Brian Rose, Morgan Shepherd, Jason Thom, Andy Thurman, Jason White and Angie Wilson all competed for the team. Most drivers finished in the top 15 with Hooper leading a lap at Darlington.

During the 2003 NASCAR Craftsman Truck Series season, Rick Ware Racing decided to focus on one driver for a full season. Jerry Hill was slated for the task.  Hill competed in 22 of the 25 events and finished 18th in the drivers' standings in the No. 5 Dodge.  Ware also raced the number 51 and 81 with a number of drivers such as Rusty Alton, Stan Boyd, Randy Briggs, Doug Keller, Carl Long, Blake Mallory, G. J. Mennen Jr., Chase Montgomery and Brian Sockwell.

After taking a leave from the series, Ware returned to the newly named NASCAR Camping World Truck Series for just two races in 2009 while competing in the Nationwide Series full-time. Chrissy Wallace in the No. 08 for Ware competed against her father, Mike Wallace, as it marked the first time a father and daughter raced in the same event in any of the top three NASCAR Series'.  Chrissy finished in front of her father in the 13th position, marking the 2nd highest finish by a female in NASCAR history.

Tim Brown, coming off his record-breaking 8th Championship at Bowman-Gray Stadium in the NASCAR Whelen Modified Series raced the truck at Martinsville as a celebration of their title earlier that month. RWR returned to the Truck Series with two full-time teams and an occasional third, using the 6, 47, and 16. Brett Butler competed in fifteen races for Rookie of the Year. Neuenberger finished 9th at Daytona as Butler finished 11th. Bobby Hamilton Jr. qualified and finished tenth on two occasions each. Travis Kvapil along with Hamilton Jr. and Butler all led laps during the season. Amber Cope, Jeffrey Earnhardt, Ken Butler III, J. C. Stout, Brian Rose, Mike Guerity, C. E. Falk, Ryan Rust, Carl Long, Derek White, Lance Fenton, Clay Greenfield, Justin Hobgood and D. J. Kennington all drove the No. 6 for 2010 in mostly 1–2 race deals.

Jeffrey Earnhardt, the 4th generation driver of the Earnhardt family, made his series debut at Gateway. Amber Cope and Angela Cope, the twin daughters of Daytona 500 winner Derrike Cope, made their respective debuts at Martinsville Speedway, as the two became the first twins to compete against each other.

For 2011, Jeffrey Earnhardt was to run for the Rookie of the Year title in the No. 1 Fuel Doctor Chevy. However, after only 3 races, the team was hit with the double tragedy of losing two crew members and Fuel Doctor announcing it could no longer sponsor RWR. Earnhardt was released from RWR after Fuel Doctor's announcement, but the two mended fences and raced again at Martinsville. However, Earnhardt was caught up in a crash running 7th with just 25 laps remaining. Bobby Hamilton Jr. raced the truck at Nashville and Carl Long and Dover before the team took a temporary break to focus on the Nationwide Series where Earnhardt would drive select races in the No. 41 car.

The Truck team would return in 2013 with multiple drivers. The program was revived in 2017, fielding the No. 12 Chevrolet Silverado for Spencer Boyd, Jordan Anderson, and Cody Ware. The No. 12 team failed to qualify the season opener at Daytona, with Boyd blowing up an engine during qualifying. The truck operation was dissolved after the fifth race of the season.

Whelen Modified Series
Rick Ware Racing joined the NASCAR Whelen Modified Series in conjunction with Tim Brown Motorsports.  Brown and Ware's relationship dates back to the '90s when Ware made his own NASCAR Sprint Cup Series debut with the help of a young mechanic, Tim Brown.  Ware promised the youngster that he would help his career once he got going but Brown needed little help.

In 2009, Brown and Ware struck a deal to partner together for his attempt at a historic 8th Championship at the famous Bowman-Gray Stadium, the oldest NASCAR sanctioned track, located in nearby Winston-Salem, NC.  Brown won five races en route to the title and the first for Ware in the series in the No. 83 Circle K/Hayes Jewelers entry.  The entire season was caught on film for the series, Madhouse featured on The History Channel.

As true to their word, Ware promised Brown a NASCAR Camping World Truck Series debut if he won the title.  Tim Brown made his truck series debut at Martinsville Speedway where he finished 27th in the No. 08.

Pinty's Series
In 2021, Rick Ware Racing made their Pinty's Series debut with Andrew Ranger as the full-time driver in the No. 51. Ware also fields the No. 52 full-time for Alex Guenette.

The team earned their first victory in the series on September 12, 2021, at Flamboro Speedway, with Ranger behind the wheel. It was also the RWR’s first victory at a NASCAR-sanctioned event.

Sports car racing

Rolex Sports Car Series

Rick Ware Racing returned to its roots of road racing as it did with Ware & Sons in the 1980s for the running of the Grand-Am Rolex 24 Hours of Daytona in 2011.

RWR competed in the GT3 Cup Division at Daytona International Speedway for the historic Rolex 24 Hours of Daytona and finished 11th in class and 25th overall with drivers, Brett Sandberg, Scott Monroe, Maurice Hull, Jeffrey Earnhardt and Doug Harrington.

The event marked the 10th anniversary of Jeffrey Earnhardt's grandfather, Dale Earnhardt and uncle Dale Earnhardt Jr.'s run in the same event.

Fuel Doctor was the primary of the No. 47 Porsche.

Asian Le Mans
In 2019, RWR began competing in the Asian Le Mans Series, fielding two Ligier JS P2s in the LMPS Am class for Cody Ware and Mark Kvamme. In their first race at Shanghai International Circuit, the team missed qualifying and much of practice as their cars were plagued by shipping delays; to ensure their cars would be up to par, the team formed a partnership with ARC Bratislava. Although the No. 25 was unable to compete in the race, Ware and Kvappe drove the No. 52 to a 14th-overall finish and second place in their class. At The Bend Motorsport Park, the team scored the LMP2 Am Trophy class win as they finished fifth overall with Ware and Gustas Grinbergas; at 16 years of age, Grinbergas became the youngest driver to win an Automobile Club de l'Ouest (ACO)-sanctioned race.

IMSA Weathertech SportsCar Championship

In August 2019, RWR announced that they will be entering the IMSA WeatherTech SportsCar Championship for the 2020 season with an updated Riley Mk. 30 in the PRO/AM LMP2 class.

In 2021, RWR formed alliance with Eurasia Motorsport to field the No. 51 Nurtec ODT Ligier for the 24 Hours of Daytona LMP2 class with drivers Cody Ware, Austin Dillon, Sven Müller, and Salih Yoluç.

In 2022, RWR fields the No. 51 Nurtec ODT Acura in the GTD class for Ryan Eversley and Aidan Read.

Motorcycle racing

AMA Arenacross Series
Rick Ware Racing has always had its heart in two-wheel racing. Rick Ware had raced a few seasons in the AMA Supercross Series in the late '80s at places like the Superdome.  In 2007, Rick Ware partnered with Tuf Honda owner, Dave Antolak and put together one of the most impressive organizations in AMA Arenacross history.

RWR with Tuf Honda with sponsorship from Bad Boy Power Drinks and Mahindra Tractors won the championship in 2007 with rider Danny Smith.  In 2008, Chad Johnson won the organization's second title in a row, and in 2009, rider Jeff Gibson made it a record three championships consecutively.

Tuf Honda with Dave Antolak has a total of 5 Championships, the most in the series history with three of those titles coming in partnership with Rick Ware Racing

AMA Supercross Series
Rick Ware Racing dates back in the Supercross to 1986 when the owner first raced in the series.  In 2007, Ware focused on putting together a team in his return that would compete with factory teams, yet remain a small independent. Brock Sellards, Tyler Bright, Jeff Dement and Tyson Hadsell completed the team under the Yamaha flagship alongside Bad Boy Power Drinks and Pro30.

Tyler Bright captured a holeshot award at Detroit (1) in the Superlites and Jeff Dement captured a holeshot award at Phoenix.

In 2008, Jake Marsack joined the organization and success followed. Marsack finished 4th at San Francisco, just one spot from the podium, and on a muddy evening in Daytona, Jake Marsack raced his way through the mud to a 3rd-place finish on the podium, marking the first time in modern-day history that an independent team finished that high.

AMA Motocross Series
RWR completed the three major series in AMA with the addition of the Motocross Series in 2007.  Riders Tyler Bright, Tyson Hadsell and Jake Marsack raced for Ware on Yamaha's with Bad Boy Power Drinks and Pro30 on board.

The team came back in 2008 and made several main events but trouble kept them from competing with the bigger budget teams in the series.

In 2009, Ware went to a single rider team with Tyler Bright on a Honda with Mahindra Tractors on board in sponsorship.

WMA Motocross Series
Few teams have scored as much success in the WMA Motocross Series, a motocross series for female riders, as Rick Ware Racing.  With Bad Boy Power Drinks and Pro30 in sponsorship, Jessica Patterson, made history on her Honda bike for the organization.

In 2006, Patterson captured her 3rd title in the series and first for RWR.  Patterson backed that title up in 2007 with Ware, becoming the most successful female rider in AMA Motocross history.  During the two years with RWR, Patterson captured 10 holeshot awards and 13 victories, never failing to make a podium during the two-year stint.

Ware went in a different direction after the 2007 season to focus more on the NASCAR, Motocross, and X-Games Series, after making his mark in the history books in the WMA Series

Summer X Games
Rick Ware Racing became interested in the crowd and excitement surrounding the X Games since its inception.  In 2009, RWR finally took the step into the events with Women's Motocross rider, Sherri Cruse for X-Games 15.

Cruse had captured the bronze medal in 2008 was highly favored in the event.  With Circle K and Fastwax on board, Cruse stumbled early in the event and charged from last place to 4th in the shorted race due to a television schedule.

Ware had faith in Cruse and went back to X-Games 15 in 2010 for the same event.  Cruse had suffered an injury just weeks before the event and still completed the event after falling during the race.  Cruse finished 8th.

RWR returned to the X Games in 2011 with a new rider in the Women's Moto X, Vicki Golden.  Golden had competed with RWR and Tuf Honda during the 2011 AMA Arenacross Series and gave her the nod for X Games 17.  Vicki Golden grabbed the holeshot for the event and went on to win gold for the organizations first gold medal in the X Games.

Other series

Allison Legacy Series
In 2012, Rick Ware Racing joined the Allison Legacy Series with Tyler Hill, the brother of Timmy Hill. Hill won the U.S. National Championship in 2009 and set a record of 10 wins in a season.  His brother Tyler Hill won the championship in 2011 after winning 13 of 18 races.

NTT Indycar Series
In 2020, Rick Ware Racing partnered with Dale Coyne Racing to field James Davison in the #51 Jacob Construction Honda for the 2020 Indy 500. The car finished in 33rd after catching fire on lap 6.

In 2021, They partnered again with Coyne to field the #51 Nurtec ODT Honda full-time. Romain Grosjean participated in all street and road course events, with his only oval race being Gateway. Instead, Grosjean's Haas F1 Team colleague Pietro Fittipaldi raced in the oval races. They also fielded the #52 Honda for Cody Ware at Road America.

In 2022, two-time Indianapolis 500 winner Takuma Sato drove the No. 51 Honda full-time.

Racing results

IndyCar Series
(key)

* Season still in progress

References

External links
 
 

American auto racing teams
Companies based in North Carolina
NASCAR teams
ARCA Menards Series teams
WeatherTech SportsCar Championship teams
IndyCar Series teams